AeroHonduras S.A./C.V. was an airline based at Toncontín International Airport in Tegucigalpa, Honduras. It operated scheduled flights within Central America and the United States.

History
Originally established as Sol Air in January 2002, the airline leased a Boeing 727-200 from Falcon Air Express and started operations on July 12 of that year. In July 2003, the Venezuelan state-owned airline Aeropostal acquired a 45% stake in the company and rebranded it as AeroHonduras; the airline's President, Ricardo Martinez, retained a 55% stake.

In August 2005, AeroHonduras suspended operations after its only operating Boeing 737-300 leased from Falcon Air Express and was taken back by the company. Although the airline initially indicated that it was a temporary move, there had been issues with financial payment for services, delays associated with repairs and financial mismanagement associated with its suspension of service.

Destinations

Fleet
AeroHonduras operated the following aircraft:

See also
List of defunct airlines of Honduras

References

External links

Aero Honduras
AeroHonduras Fleet Detail

Defunct airlines of Honduras
Airlines established in 2002
Airlines disestablished in 2005
2002 establishments in Honduras